Jacqueline Wong Sum-wing (born 23 January 1989) is an American-born Hong Kong Canadian actress and television host. She won the Miss Hong Kong 2012 first runner-up title and placed in the top 12 talents at Miss World 2013. In 2022, her contract with Television Broadcasts Limited (TVB) ended.

Life and career

1989-2012: Early years
On 23 January 1989, Wong was born in New York City. She is the youngest sister of four, with Scarlett Wong (artiste and former host of ViuTV) as her elder sister. At the age of seven, she moved and settled in Vancouver with her family. In 2012, Wong was attending the University of British Columbia, studying her Master of Business Administration before competing for Miss Hong Kong 2012. Raised by her Cantonese family in the United States and Canada, Wong is fluent in English and Cantonese.

2012-2018: Beauty pageants and TVB career
Wong competed at Miss Hong Kong 2012 and won the first runner-up title. In the following year, she represented Hong Kong for Miss World 2013 and placed on the top 12 talents. Like all beauty pageant winners, she was offered a contract with TVB and received training to become an entertainer. Wong had starred in 14 TVB dramas since 2013. She won My Favourite TVB Supporting Actress at the 2017 StarHub TVB Awards.

2019-2021: Two-timing scandal with Andy Hui

On 16 April 2019, Wong received heavy media exposure for her physical intimacies with married Hong Kong singer and actor Andy Hui; dubbing it "安心". At the time of the incident, Hui was married to singer-actress Sammi Cheng and Wong was in a steady relationship with actor Kenneth Ma. The two shared a taxi ride, where they engaged in intimate acts recorded by the taxi's in-vehicle camera. The video was later made public by various news outlets. Since the scandal broke, Wong blocked comments from her social media accounts after her posts were flooded with negative comments and publicly apologized on social media: "I can’t face myself and do not know how to face my family, Kenneth Ma, friends, company and colleagues... I don’t dare to ask everyone for forgiveness, and only beseech everyone to give some space to all the people who have been implicated."

Wong's public image was tarnished and promotions using her image were removed or blocked. She and Ma ended their relationship and Wong returned overseas to Los Angeles for 8 months to avoid public scrutiny and tabloids. During her hiatus, Wong’s scenes in the drama Forensic Heroes IV were re-shot with Roxanne Tong, who began dating Ma in 2020. While Andy Hui is able to salvage his career, Wong's fate remains unknown.

After her 8-month hiatus, the dramas Finding Her Voice (牛下女高音) and Handmaiden United (丫鬟大聯盟), in which Wong played major roles, were aired to gauge the public's reaction; the series were met with low ratings. During the promotion of the dramas, she was visibly absent. When reporters asked about any comeback plans or change of careers, she replied she had no plans nor thoughts of it.

2022: Leaving TVB and free agency
After a three-year career freeze, Wong's contract with TVB eventually ended in July 2022. A free agent, she has yet to return to the entertainment industry. She has been dating Rubberband drummer Lai Man Wang (泥鯭) and the two live together at Wong's home.

Filmography

Television series

Variety shows

Awards

Discography

References

External links

Jacqueline Wong at Sina Weibo
Jacqueline Wong at Instagram

1989 births
Living people
Hong Kong television actresses
TVB actors
21st-century Hong Kong actresses
American emigrants to Canada
Miss World 2013 delegates
Actresses from Vancouver
Canadian emigrants to Hong Kong
Actresses from New York City
Canadian actresses of Hong Kong descent
American born Hong Kong artists